Sven Yidah (born 18 December 1998 in Nairobi) is a Kenyan footballer who currently plays for South Africa's Premier Soccer League side Marumo Gallants F.C. and the Kenya national football team as a midfielder.

Career
Sven started out at Ligi Ndogo S.C. Academy before making a switch to FC Kariobangi Sharks in January 2016 for an initial four seasons. He extended his stay at the club at the end of the 2018 season for another three seasons to the end of the year 2021. 
He left Kariobangi Sharks before expiry of his contract to join Nairobi City Stars in September 2020  on a two-year deal. Upon expiry of his contract, Sven crossed borders to try out with South African tp-tier side Marumo Gallants F.C. that features in the Premier Soccer League. Weeks later, he was taken in after an official (free) transfer from Nairobi City Stars. 

Sven is best remembered for his distinctive penalty celebrations against M'Bao FC in the 2019 Kenyan Cup, which became a global phenomenon. He replicated that after scoring a penalty against Everton.

Kenya U-23
In July 2021 he made the cut to be part of the Kenya U23 squad that traveled to Bahir Dar, Ethiopia for the CECAFA Under-23 Challenge Cup.

Honors

Club
Kariobangi Sharks
Kenyan Nationwide League
 Runners-up (1): 2016
GOtv Shield
 Champion (1): 2018
 Runners-up (2): 2017, 2019
Kenyan Super Cup
 Champion (1): 2018/19
SportPesa Super Cup
 Champion (1): 2019
SportPesa Trophy
 Champion (1): 2019

References

External links

1998 births
Living people
Footballers from Nairobi
Kenyan footballers
Kenyan Premier League players
Kenya international footballers
Ligi Ndogo S.C. players
Nairobi City Stars players
F.C. Kariobangi Sharks players
Marumo Gallants F.C. players
Association football midfielders